The 5000 and 10000 metres distances for men in the 2010–11 ISU Speed Skating World Cup were contested over six races on six occasions, out of a total of eight World Cup occasions for the season, with the first occasion taking place in Heerenveen, Netherlands, on 12–14 November 2010, and the final occasion also taking place in Heerenveen on 4–6 March 2011.

Bob de Jong of the Netherlands won the cup, while Ivan Skobrev of Russia repeated his second place from the previous season, and Bob de Vries of the Netherlands came third. The defending champion, Håvard Bøkko of Norway, came fourth.

Top three

Race medallists

Standings
Standings as of 6 March 2011 (end of the season).

References

Men 5000